The 1983–84 Chicago Black Hawks season was the 58th season of operation of the Chicago Black Hawks in the National Hockey League (NHL).

Off-season
The Black Hawks had a fairly quiet off-season, however, the club did complete a trade with the Philadelphia Flyers, sending defenseman Doug Crossman and their second-round draft pick in the 1984 NHL Entry Draft to the Flyers in exchange for defenseman Behn Wilson.  Wilson had spent his entire five year career with Philadelphia, and in the 1982–83 season had 8 goals and 32 points in 62 games, as well as 92 penalty minutes.

At the 1983 NHL Entry Draft, Chicago selected defenseman Bruce Cassidy from the Ottawa 67's of the Ontario Hockey League (OHL) with their first-round draft pick. Cassidy appeared in 70 games with the 67's, scoring 25 goals and 111 points. In the tenth round of the draft, the club selected goaltender and future Hockey Hall of Fameer Dominik Hasek.

Regular season
The Black Hawks got off to a solid start, going 7–3–0 in their first ten games. However, Chicago would win one of their next seven games to fall below the .500 mark with an 8–9–0 record. The Hawks continued to struggle, as they team had trouble scoring goals, as they limped their way to a 30–42–8 record, earning 68 points and the fourth and final playoff position in the Norris Division, seven points ahead of the fifth-placed Toronto Maple Leafs. Chicago's point total was 36 fewer than the previous season, and the 271 goals that they scored ranked them 19th, 3rd worst in the NHL.

Denis Savard led the club with 37 goals, a career-high. However, his 94-points total was a 27-point drop off from the previous season.  Steve Larmer had 35 goals and 75 points while appearing in all 80 games. Doug Wilson led the Black Hawks defence, scoring 13 goals and 58 points, and Bob Murray had 11 goals and 48 points. Behn Wilson led the team with 143 penalty minutes.

In goal, Murray Bannerman became the number one goalie, going 23–29–4 with a 3.38 goals against average (GAA) and a .887 save percentage in 56 games. Tony Esposito became the backup, as he had a 5–10–3 record with a 4.82 GAA and a .859 save percentage in 18 games.

Final standings

Schedule and results

Playoffs

Minnesota North Stars 3, Chicago Black Hawks 2
The Black Hawks opened the playoffs with a best-of-five Norris Division semi-final series against the Minnesota North Stars, who finished the season with the best record in the division at 39-31-10, earning 88 points, which was 20 more than the Black Hawks.  Chicago had eliminated the North Stars from the playoffs during the previous two seasons, in 1982 and 1983.  The series opened with two games at the Met Center in Bloomington, Minnesota, and Hawks, led by two third period goals by Al Secord and 34 saves by Murray Bannerman stunned the North Stars and took the first game by a 3-1 score.  Despite heavily outshooting and outplaying the Black Hawks in the second game, Minnesota and Chicago were tied at three after two periods.  In the third period, the North Stars put the game away, scoring three times, en route to a 6-5 win and tying the series at 1-1.  The series shifted to Chicago Stadium for the next two games, and the North Stars easily handed the Black Hawks a 4-1 loss in the third game to take the series lead.  In the fourth game, Chicago's Troy Murray scored a late third period goal, helping the Hawks to a 4-3 victory, and force a fifth and deciding game back in Minnesota.  In the fifth game, the North Stars Dennis Maruk led the way with two goals, as Minnesota defeated Chicago 4-1 and eliminated the Black Hawks.

Player statistics

Regular season
Scoring

Goaltending

Playoffs
Scoring

Goaltending

Note: Pos = Position; GP = Games played; G = Goals; A = Assists; Pts = Points; +/- = plus/minus; PIM = Penalty minutes; PPG = Power-play goals; SHG = Short-handed goals; GWG = Game-winning goals
      MIN = Minutes played; W = Wins; L = Losses; T = Ties; GA = Goals-against; GAA = Goals-against average; SO = Shutouts;

Awards and records

Transactions

Draft picks
Chicago's draft picks at the 1983 NHL Entry Draft held at the Montreal Forum in Montreal, Quebec.

Farm teams

See also
1983–84 NHL season

References

External links
 

Chicago Blackhawks seasons
Chicago Blackhawks
Chicago Blackhawks
Chicago
Chicago